Sycamore Creek is a tributary to Crabtree Creek that rises in a pond near Lynns Crossroads in Durham County then flows southward to join Crabtree Creek in Wake County, North Carolina.  Sycamore Creek flows mostly through William B. Umstead State Park.  The watershed is more forested at 43% than most in the Crabtree Creek watershed.

See also
List of rivers of North Carolina

External links
 William B. Umstead State Park

References

Rivers of North Carolina
Rivers of Wake County, North Carolina
Tributaries of Pamlico Sound